Big Guy Books is an independent publisher of children's books founded by Robert Gould. Its books are aimed at encouraging boys to read.  

The company is based in Encinitas, California.

References

External links
 Big Guy Books Website

Companies based in Carlsbad, California
Book publishing companies based in California